Bill Perryman was an Australian actor with extensive experience in stage and radio. He was the father of Jill Perryman.

References

Australian male radio actors
Year of birth missing
Place of birth missing
Year of death missing